George Forest Firestone (July 27, 1876 – July 12, 1940) was an American football player and coach.  He served as the head coach at Buchtel College—now known as the University of Akron—for one season in 1902, compiling a record of 2–5.  Firestone was born on July 27, 1876 in Akron, Ohio and died on July 12, 1940 in Cambridge, Ohio.

Head coaching record

References

External links
 

1876 births
1940 deaths
19th-century players of American football
Akron Zips football coaches
Michigan Wolverines football players
Players of American football from Akron, Ohio